1,5-Diazacyclooctane is an organic compound with the formula (CHCHCHNH).  It is a colorless oil.  1,5-Diazacyclooctane is a cyclic diamine.

Synthesis and reactions
It is prepared in low yield by the alkylation of hydrazine with 1,3-dibromopropane.

The N-H centers can be replaced with many other groups. As a bis secondary amine, it condenses with aldehydes to give bicyclic derivatives. When treated with transition metal salts, it serves as a chelating ligand.

Related compounds
 1,4-Diazacycloheptane
 1,5-Diaza-3,7-diphosphacyclooctanes
 Tröger's base

References

Diamines
Chelating agents
Nitrogen heterocycles